Frank E. Wetherell (1869 – 1961) was an American architect in the U.S. state of Iowa who was active from 1892 to 1931. He founded the second oldest architectural firm in the state in Des Moines, Iowa, in 1905. He worked with Roland Harrison (born in 1889, age 95 in 1983) in partnership Wetherell & Harrison. The firm designed numerous Masonic buildings.

Wetherell frequently collaborated with Oliver O. Smith. With the addition of Alvah J. Gage, the firm became Smith, Wetherell & Gage. and later Smith & Gage. Wetherell was prominent statewide as an architect known for public buildings, residences, and urban planning. At least 44 extant properties in Oskaloosa, Iowa are attributed to him.

He was a parishioner of St. James Episcopal Church (Oskaloosa, Iowa), which he designed in Gothic Revival architecture.

Notable works
Many of Wetherell's and the firms' works as well as works of his partners are listed on the U.S. National Register of Historic Places (NRHP).

Works include:
Alden Public Library, 1012 Water St. Alden, IA (Wetherell & Gage), NRHP-listed
Appanoose County Courthouse, Van Buren and N. 12th St. Centerville, IA (Smith & Gage), NRHP-listed 
Bedford Public Library, Jefferson St. Bedford, IA (Wetherell & Gage), NRHP-listed
Bloomfield Public Library, 107 N. Columbia Bloomfield, IA (Wetherell & Gage), NRHP-listed
Burns United Methodist Church, 811 Crocker St. Des Moines, IA (Wetherell & Gage), NRHP-listed
Cherokee Public Library, 215 S. 2nd St. Cherokee, IA (Wetherell, F.E.), NRHP-listed
Decatur County Courthouse, 9th St. Leon, IA (Smith, Wetherell and Gage), NRHP-listed
Drake Municipal Observatory, Waveland Park, Des Moines, IA
Eagle Grove Public Library, 401 W. Broadway Eagle Grove, IA (Smith & Gage), NRHP-listed 
Eldon Carnegie Public Library, 608 W. Elm St. Eldon, IA (Wetherell and Gage), NRHP-listed
Forest Cemetery Entrance, Jct. of N. 9th St. and J Ave. E. Oskaloosa, IA (Wetherell, Frank E.), NRHP-listed
E. H. Gibbs House, William Penn College Campus, N. Market Extension Oskaloosa, IA (Wetherell, Frank E.), NRHP-listed
Phil Hoffman House, 807 High Ave. E. Oskaloosa, IA (Wetherell, Frank E.), NRHP-listed
Homestead Building, 303 Locust St. Des Moines, IA (Smith & Gage), NRHP-listed
Keokuk County Courthouse, Main St. Sigourney, IA (Wetherell & Gage), NRHP-listed
Laurens Carnegie Free Library, 263 N. 3rd St. Laurens, IA (Wetherell & Gage), NRHP-listed
Lincoln School, 911 B Ave. W. Oskaloosa, IA (Wetherell, Frank E.), NRHP-listed
Malek Theatre, 116 2nd Ave. NE. Independence, IA (Wetherell & Harrison), NRHP-listed
Oskaloosa City Hall, jct. of S. Market St. and 2nd Ave. E., NE corner Oskaloosa, IA (Wetherell, Frank E.), NRHP-listed
Oskaloosa City Park and Band Stand, City Park Oskaloosa, IA (Wetherell, Frank E.), NRHP-listed
Oskaloosa Fire Station, 109-111 2nd Ave. E. Oskaloosa, IA (Wetherell, Frank E.), NRHP-listed
Oskaloosa Public Library, Southwestern corner of the junction of Market St. and 2nd Ave. Oskaloosa, IA (Wetherell, Frank E.), NRHP-listed
Seeberger-Loring-Kilburn House, 509 High Ave., E. Oskaloosa, IA (Wetherell, Frank E.), NRHP-listed
C.F. and Mary Singmaster House, 32263 190th St. Keota, IA (Wetherell of Oskaloosa), NRHP-listed
St. James Episcopal Church, jct. of 1st Ave. and S. 3rd St., SW corner Oskaloosa, IA (Wetherell, Frank E.), NRHP-listed
Sioux Theatre, 218 Main St. Sioux Rapids, Iowa (Wetherell & Harrison), NRHP-listed
The Capitol Theater, 211 N. Third St. Burlington, IA (Wetherall & Harrison), NRHP-listed
Thomas I. Stoner House, 1030 56th St. Des Moines, IA (Wetherell & Harrison), NRHP-listed
Scottish Rite Consistory Building (Des Moines, Iowa), 6th Ave. and Park St., Des Moines, Iowa (Roland Harrison), NRHP-listed
One or more works in Courthouse Square Historic District, Roughly bounded by Van Buren, Haynes, Maple, and 10th Sts. Centerville, IA (Smith & Gage), NRHP-listed
One or more works in Drake University Campus Historic District, roughly two blocks along University Ave. near Twenty-fifth St. Des Moines, IA (Smith & Gage), NRHP-listed
One or more works in Highland Park Historic Business District at Euclid and Sixth Avenues, roughly jct. of Euclis Ave. and Sixth Ave. Des Moines, IA (Wetherell & Gage), NRHP-listed
One or more works in the Grinnell Historic Commercial District, Roughly bounded by Main, Broad, and Commercial Sts. and 5th Ave., Grinnell, Iowa (F.E. Wetherell), NRHP-listed
One or more works in Montezuma Downtown Historic District, Roughly along 3rd, 4th, Main & Liberty Sts. around courthouse square, Montezuma, IA (Frank E. Wetherell), NRHP-listed
One or more works in Public Square Historic District, roughly around Keokuk County Court House Sigourney, IA (Wetherell and Gage), NRHP-listed
One or more buildings in the Washington and Elizabeth Miller Tract-Center-Soll Community Historic District, NRHP-listed
One or more works in Winterset Courthouse Square Commercial Historic District, roughly bounded by Green & 2nd Sts., 2nd Ave. & alley S. of Court Ave. Winterset, IA (Wetherell and Gage), NRHP-listed

See also
Winslow & Wetherell

References

Architects from Iowa
American architects
1889 births
1961 deaths